Marie Svensson (born 9 August 1967) is a female former international table tennis player from Sweden.

Table tennis career
From 1986 to 2000 she won seven medals in singles, and doubles events in the Table Tennis European Championships, and a bronze medal in the mixed doubles with Erik Lindh at the 1995 World Table Tennis Championships in Tianjin.

See also
 List of table tennis players
 List of World Table Tennis Championships medalists

References

1967 births
Swedish female table tennis players
Olympic table tennis players of Sweden
Table tennis players at the 1992 Summer Olympics
Table tennis players at the 1996 Summer Olympics
Table tennis players at the 2000 Summer Olympics
Living people
21st-century Swedish women